Fabián Diego Pumar Bravo  (born 14 February 1976 in Montevideo) is a Uruguayan football defender who played for Bella Vista, Fénix and Cerro of Uruguay; Racing Club de Avellaneda of Argentina and Universitario of Peru.

Honours

 Uruguay
 1999 Copa América: 2nd place

External links
 Profile at Tenfield Digital 
 Argentine Primera Statistics at Fútbol XXI 

1976 births
Living people
Uruguayan footballers
1999 Copa América players
C.A. Bella Vista players
Racing Club de Avellaneda footballers
Club Universitario de Deportes footballers
Argentinos Juniors footballers
Centro Atlético Fénix players
Comunicaciones F.C. players
Danubio F.C. players
C.A. Cerro players
Uruguayan Primera División players
Argentine Primera División players
Uruguayan expatriate footballers
Expatriate footballers in China
Expatriate footballers in Argentina
Expatriate footballers in Peru
Expatriate footballers in Guatemala
Association football defenders